Mary Therese McDonnell (born 26 August 1986), is an Irish American soccer defender. She is a Republic of Ireland women's national football team player. After being released from St. Louis Athletica's preseason training camp in March 2010, she rejoined the Chicago Red Stars for 2011.

College career
McDonnell attended Carl Sandburg High School then spent four years at the University of Illinois at Urbana–Champaign studying speech and hearing sciences. In 2012, she played for the University of Illinois College of Law Club team, Learned Foot, in the Chamapign County Soccer League helping the Learned Foot win the title.

Club career
After graduating McDonnell played for Boston Renegades in the 2008 W-League season, scoring four goals in five games.

McDonnell was assigned to Sky Blue FC in the 2009 WPS Draft. However, she was released the week before the squads were finalised and instead joined Chicago Red Stars as a developmental player. In July 2009 McDonnell played for the Irish national team against her Chicago Red Stars club side in an exhibition game at the Sports Complex at Benedictine University. The Red Stars released McDonnell in September 2009.

She then attended St. Louis Athletica's preseason training camp,

International career
McDonnell first appeared for the Republic of Ireland in three friendly games against the United States in September 2008. She said, "After college I played in Boston for a summer and it turned out my coach was Irish. He literally walked up to us on the practice field and asked if any of us were Irish, and one thing led to another. It’s been great." Mary Therese and elder sister Shannon featured in Ireland's qualifying campaigns for Euro 2009 and World Cup 2011. Daughters of Ian and Jean McDonnell, their eligibility for the Irish team derived from their grandfather; who was from Foxford.

Both sisters were called up to the national squad in August 2011, ahead of the Euro 2013 qualifying series.

References

External links
Mary Therese McDonnell at Illinois Fighting Illini
Mary Therese McDonnell at UEFA
Mary Therese McDonnell at FAI

Republic of Ireland women's association footballers
Republic of Ireland women's international footballers
1986 births
Living people
People from Orland Park, Illinois
Sportspeople from Cook County, Illinois
American women's soccer players
Illinois Fighting Illini women's soccer players
Women's association football defenders
USL W-League (1995–2015) players
Boston Renegades players
Women's Premier Soccer League Elite players